Bobby "The Geek" Holík (born January 1, 1971) is a Czech-American former professional ice hockey center who played 18 seasons in the National Hockey League (NHL). Holík is the son of Jaroslav Holík, a Czechoslovak ice hockey world champion in 1972 and Czech national team head coach who led the under-20 team to world titles in 2000 and 2001. Holík is the current head coach of the Israel men's national ice hockey team.

Playing career
Holík began his NHL career playing for the Hartford Whalers in 1990 after being selected tenth overall by them in the 1989 NHL Entry Draft. After two seasons with the Whalers, he was traded to the New Jersey Devils where he played for ten seasons, featuring as a member of the "Crash Line" alongside Mike Peluso and Randy McKay, and winning two Stanley Cup championships, in 1995 and 2000. Prior to the 2002–03 season, as a free agent, Holík signed a five-year, $45 million contract with the New York Rangers.

In 2005, following the 2004–05 NHL lockout, the Rangers bought out the remainder of Holík's contract, after which he signed with the Atlanta Thrashers. On October 2, 2007, he was named captain of the Thrashers for the 2007–08 season.

On July 1, 2008, as a free agent, Holík signed a one-year contract with the New Jersey Devils for the 2008–09 season, returning to the team he played ten seasons with.

On May 23, 2009, following the conclusion of the 2008–09 season, Holík announced his retirement from the NHL. He was 38 when he retired and cited a focus to be with his family.

Personal life
Holík became an American citizen in a ceremony in Newark, New Jersey, on November 4, 1996. He is married with a daughter, Hannah Marie Holík, born in 1997, and splits his time between Wyoming and Florida.

Holík's nephew, David Musil, was drafted by the Edmonton Oilers.

Holík is an avid rifle, pistol and shotgun enthusiast. After being introduced to firearms manufacturer CZ-USA's president Alice Poluchová by shooting instructor Shepard Humphries, Holík became CZ-USA's celebrity representative.

Awards and achievements
 Stanley Cup champion – 1994–95, 1999–2000
 NHL All-Star – 1998, 1999

Career statistics

Regular season and playoffs

International

See also
List of NHL players with 1000 games played

References

External links
 

1971 births
Living people
American people of Czech descent
Atlanta Thrashers captains
Atlanta Thrashers players
Czechoslovak emigrants to the United States
Czech ice hockey centres
Czechoslovak ice hockey centres
Hartford Whalers draft picks
Hartford Whalers players
Israel men's national ice hockey team coaches
National Hockey League All-Stars
National Hockey League first-round draft picks
New Jersey Devils players
New York Rangers players
Sportspeople from Jihlava
Stanley Cup champions
Utica Devils players
Czech expatriate sportspeople in Israel
American expatriate sportspeople in Israel
Czechoslovak expatriate sportspeople in the United States